Henry Hickman Harte (1790–1848) was an Irish mathematician and clergyman.

Life
Harte, the son of a solicitor, was born in the county of Limerick, Ireland in 1790. He entered Trinity College Dublin in 1806, and became a Scholar in 1809. He earned his BA in 1811 (and MA in 1823), and served as the Donegall Lecturer in Mathematics from 1827 to 1832. In 1831 Harte accepted the college living of Cappagh, diocese of Derry, co. Tyrone; and died on Sunday, 5 April 1848, having preached on the same day in his church, where he was also buried. Harte was author of a translation of Laplace's Système du Monde, to which work he added 'Mathematical Proofs and Explanatory Remarks,' Dublin, 1830. He also published a translation of Poisson's Mécanique, with Notes, 2 vols. London, 1842, 8vo, and commenced another of Laplace's Mécanique Céleste.

References

External links
 Harte, Henry Hickman (1790–1848), mathematician The Oxford Dictionary of National Biography

1790 births
1848 deaths
Donegall Lecturers of Mathematics at Trinity College Dublin
Irish mathematicians
Clergy from Limerick (city)